Three Kings is a one-person play by Stephen Beresford.

Production history 
The play premiered as part of The Old Vic, London's Old Vic: In Camera series broadcasting performances live from The Old Vic's empty auditorium to audiences worldwide during the COVID-19 pandemic. The play was written for and performed by Andrew Scott as Patrick and directed by Matthew Warchus, with Katy Rudd as associate director.

The play was due to be performed from 29 July to 1 August 2020, however Scott was forced to undergo minor surgery. The play was postponed to 3 to 5 September 2020.

The playtext will be published by Nick Hern Books on 10 September 2020.

Critical reception 
The play received positive reviews from critics and audiences with four star reviews from The Guardian, The Telegraph and BroadwayWorld.

References 

2020 plays
British plays
Plays for one performer